Mount Elizabeth Station is a pastoral lease that operates as a cattle station in Western Australia.

The abundant water supply and multiple food sources of the area enabled Aboriginal peoples to develop a rich cultural life in the area. Examples of both the Gwion Gwion rock paintings and Wandjina artwork can be found on rock outcrops at the station.

Gold prospector and explorer Frank Hann visited the area in 1898 and named Mount Elizabeth after his mother.

Pioneer Frank Lacy drove a herd of cattle across the Kimberley and established the station in 1945. Both Lacy and his wife, Theresa, are buried near the homestead.

The Lacy family has held the lease since 1945 and started offering accommodation to tourists in addition to rearing cattle in the 2000s.

 the  property was still on the market along with at least 15 others in the Kimberley and Northern Territory. The property is stocked with approximately 6,000 head of cattle.

Climate
Mount Elizabeth as a tropical savannah climate (Aw). Winters (dry season) are short and dry with very warm days and cool nights due to the high elevation. Summers are very hot and rainy with oppressive humidity leading up to the wet season.

See also
List of ranches and stations
List of pastoral leases in Western Australia

References

Kimberley (Western Australia)
Stations (Australian agriculture)
Pastoral leases in Western Australia